The Thomasville Open was a golf tournament on the LPGA Tour, played only in 1952. It was played in Thomasville, Georgia. Betsy Rawls won the event.

References

Former LPGA Tour events
Golf in Georgia (U.S. state)
History of women in Georgia (U.S. state)